Visitor is a 2021 Spanish horror film with science fiction elements directed by Alberto Evangelio starring Iria del Río, Miquel Fernández, Jan Cornet and Sandra Cervera. Dialogue goes back and forth between Spanish and Valencian.

Plot 
The plot tracks Marga, who, in the wake of a couple crisis, moves to the countryside family manor, where an interdimensional gateway is activated as a cube artifact located in the cellar is switched on.

Cast

Production 
Visitor is Alberto Evangelio's debut as a feature film director. Penned by Evangelio, the screenplay is based on a story by Evangelio and Marcos Gisbert. Guillem Oliver worked as cinematographer. Visitor is a Beniwood Producciones, Chester Media, Desconectada la película AIE, Life and Pictures and The Other Side Films production. It had the participation of IVC, the Spanish Ministry of Culture, Crea SGR,  and TV3.

Filming lasted from August to September 2020. Shooting locations included Puçol, province of Valencia.

Release 
The film had its world premiere at the Sitges Film Festival in October 2021. Distributed by Filmax, the film was theatrically released in Spain on 11 February 2022.

Accolades 

|-
| align = "center" rowspan = "2" | 2022 || rowspan = "2" | 14th Gaudí Awards || colspan = "2" | Best Film ||  || rowspan = "2" | 
|-
| colspan = "2" | Public's Choice Award || 
|}

External links 
 List of Spanish films of 2022

References 

2020s Catalan-language films
2020s Spanish-language films
2021 science fiction horror films
Spanish science fiction horror films
Films shot in the province of Valencia
2020s Spanish films